Six Feet Down Under Part II is a limited edition commemorative live EP by the American heavy metal band Metallica. It is the second part of the band's previous live EP, Six Feet Down Under, and was released exclusively in Australia and New Zealand, on November 12, 2010 through Universal Music. Like the predecessor EP, it has been sold by Trans-Tasman record stores, Metallica online store and iTunes only, and contains eight songs from the early part of the tour in Australia and New Zealand in 2010 as voted by members of the Metallica Fan Club living in those areas.

Track listing

Personnel
 James Hetfield – lead vocals, rhythm guitar
 Kirk Hammett – lead guitar, backing vocals
 Robert Trujillo – bass, backing vocals
 Lars Ulrich – drums

References

2010 EPs
Metallica live albums
Live EPs
2010 live albums
Universal Music Group live albums
Universal Music Group EPs
Metallica EPs